Chris Rodriguez (born July 20, 1998) is an American professional baseball pitcher for the Los Angeles Angels of Major League Baseball (MLB).

Career
Rodriguez attended Monsignor Edward Pace High School in Miami Gardens, Florida. He was drafted by the Los Angeles Angels in the fourth round of the 2016 MLB Draft. He missed all of 2018 and most of 2019 due to a back injury. He did not play a minor league game in 2020 due to the cancellation of the minor league season caused by the COVID-19 pandemic.

2021
The Angels added Rodriguez to their 40-man roster after the 2020 season. On April 2, 2021, Rodriguez made his MLB debut in relief against the Chicago White Sox, pitching two innings with three strikeouts. On May 6, he was placed on the 10-day injured list after experiencing shoulder inflammation. On June 4, Rodriguez was activated from the injured list and made his return 3 days later in relief against the Kansas City Royals. He was sent down to double-A Rocket City on June 21 after putting up a 9.00 ERA since returning from his shoulder injury. On August 2, 2021, Rodriguez was called back up to the major league roster, making his first career start against the Texas Rangers. He pitched 6 innings, allowing 3 runs and striking out 7 batters. Rodriguez would later be optioned back and forth from the major league roster several times until August 14, 2021 when he was placed on the 7-day injured list while with the Triple-A Salt Lake Bees due to a lat strain, eventually shutting him down for the rest of the season. In 15 appearances, he posted a 2-1 record with a 3.65 ERA and 29 strikeouts. On November 8, 2021, it was announced that Rodriguez was expected to miss most of, if not all of the 2022 season after undergoing right capsule surgery.

2022
Rodriguez was placed on the 60-day injured list to begin the 2022 season, and was shut down in August without seeing game action on the year.

References

External links

1998 births
Living people
Sportspeople from Coral Springs, Florida
Baseball players from Florida
Major League Baseball pitchers
Los Angeles Angels players
Arizona League Angels players
Orem Owlz players
Burlington Bees players
Inland Empire 66ers of San Bernardino players
Rocket City Trash Pandas players
Salt Lake Bees players
Monsignor Edward Pace High School alumni